G1, stylized as g1, is a Brazilian news portal maintained by Grupo Globo and under the guidance of Central Globo de Jornalismo. It was released on 18 September 2006, the year Rede Globo turned 41 years old. The portal provides the journalism content of the various companies of the Grupo Globo – TV Globo, Globo News, Radios CBN and Globo, the newspapers O Globo, Extra, Expresso and Valor Econômico, Época and Globo Rural magazines, among others – besides its own reports in the form of text, photographs, audio and video.

In addition to five editorial offices in Rio de Janeiro, São Paulo, Brasilia, Belo Horizonte and Recife, affiliates of Rede Globo, newspapers, magazines, radio stations and news agencies Agência Estado, Agence France Presse, Associated Press, EFE, The New York Times, Lusa and Reuters feed the news portal, which is updated 24 hours a day.

The portal stands out for its multimedia content, taking advantage of the internet's advantages over traditional means of communication.

Versions in English and Spanish were released on 11 June 2010, and had videos subtitled in both languages., but both versions no longer exist.

The portal also has the mobile version and applications for Android and iOS.

In September 2021, to celebrate its 15th anniversary, the portal changed its logo to a new style, also changing the stylizing of the name, changing the G to be lowercase.

References

External links
 
 
 

Brazilian news websites